Oceans of Kansas is a book by Michael J. Everhart, Adjunct Curator of Paleontology at the Sternberg Museum of Natural History and past President of the Kansas Academy of Science. It was published in 2005 by Indiana University Press. It has an award-winning, concomitant website entitled Oceans of Kansas Paleontology. A revised, updated, and expanded edition was published in 2017. It is part of the life of the past series.

Summary
In Oceans of Kansas Everhart discusses the state of the land during the Late Cretaceous and earlier, when the area was covered with the marine waters of the Western Interior Seaway, particularly focusing on the record of the Niobrara Cycle of the Seaway as exposed in central Northwestern Kansas (e.g., Trego and Gove Counties). The geologic record shows that ancient lifeforms such as marine reptiles, pteranodons, and toothed birds inhabited the general area both in and out of the water. Everhart also covers the discovery of the fossils and geographic records as well as the competition between E. D. Cope and O. C. Marsh to collect them.

Reception
Oceans of Kansas has received multiple critical reviews, with Jeffrey V. Yule stating that "Oceans of Kansas offers a well researched and often engaging account of the paleobiology of the Western Interior Seaway...". Jonathan Hendricks noted that while the book's "intended audience  is  not  entirely  clear... as  a  needed summary  of  our  knowledge about the fossils found in the Cretaceous rocks of  western Kansas and elsewhere in the Great Plains, Everhart's book is a success."

Notes

External links
 Oceans of Kansas Paleontology website

Paleontology books
Biology textbooks
2005 non-fiction books
2005 in paleontology